Andrew Roane Dick (born Andrew Thomlinson; December 21, 1965) is an American comedian, actor, musician, and television and film producer. Known professionally as a comic, his first regular television role was on the short-lived but influential,  Fox's The Ben Stiller Show. In the mid-1990s, he had a long-running stint on NBC's NewsRadio and was a supporting character on Less than Perfect. He briefly had his own program, The Andy Dick Show, on MTV. He is noted for his outlandish behavior on a number of Comedy Central Roasts and other appearances. He is also known for his eccentric behavior, struggles with drug addiction, and numerous sexual misconduct allegations and arrests.

Early life and education 
Dick was born on December 21, 1965, in Charleston, South Carolina, as Andrew Thomlinson. He was adopted at birth by Allen and Sue Dick, and named Andrew Roane Dick. He was brought up Presbyterian. His father was in the Navy.

As a child, he spent time living with his family in Connecticut, Pennsylvania, New York, and Yugoslavia before moving to Chicago in 1979. He attended George Walton Comprehensive High School in Cobb County, Georgia. Dick appeared in numerous theater productions during his high school year. He was elected homecoming king his senior year in 1983. He graduated from Joliet West High School in Joliet, Illinois in 1984.

While in high school, he tended to use his surname as a joke; and one day, he dressed in a homemade superhero costume and presented himself at school as "Super Dick". Dick has been a friend of actor Anthony Rapp since childhood.

After high school, Dick joined Chicago's Second City, attended Illinois Wesleyan University for a semester before attending Columbia College Chicago, where he performed most of his university studies, and took improv comedy classes at iO Theater.

Career

Television 

Dick started his TV comedy career as a cast member on the sketch comedy program The Ben Stiller Show, which aired on the Fox Network from September 1992 to January 1993.

In 1993, on the third night of David Letterman's new CBS show, Dick appeared as "Donnie the CBS Page Who Likes to Suck Up", during which he gave a watch to Letterman. The host then handed him a pencil, prompting Dick to cry and then walk backstage to much applause.

In 1994, Dick played the part of Pepé the stylist in the episode "Maggie the Model" on The Nanny. He also starred as Zachary Smart, the son of Maxwell Smart and Agent 99, in the Get Smart Fox television remake (a role he reportedly tried to escape in order to go into work with NewsRadio). In 2001, Dick starred along with Kieran Culkin on the short lived NBC summer television series Go Fish.

Dick has been a series regular on several sitcoms for their entire duration, including NewsRadio on NBC (1995–1999), portraying accident-prone reporter Matthew Brock, and on the ABC sitcom Less than Perfect as Owen Kronsky.

In 2001, he, along with colleagues and producers, developed a show on MTV called The Andy Dick Show. The series ended in 2003 after three seasons. In 2004, he starred in a satirical reality television show, also on MTV, called The Assistant. The show spoofed themes and scenes from The Apprentice, The Bachelor, Queer Eye for the Straight Guy, and Survivor, among others.

Dick had also had a guest shot on Star Trek: Voyager as the Emergency Medical Hologram Mark II in "Message in a Bottle". He competed in the eighth season of Celebrity Poker Showdown. He finished in last place, behind Robin Tunney, Christopher Meloni, Macy Gray, and Joy Behar.

On May 16, 2007, Dick was roasted on The Howard Stern Show by Artie Lange, Lisa Lampanelli, Reverend Bob Levy, Sal Governale, Shuli, Colin Quinn, Benjy Bronk, Dave Attell, Greg Fitzsimmons, and Yucko the Clown.

In 2008, Dick appeared on episode No. 3 of The Real World: Hollywood to tell cast members that they would be taking improv classes.

Dick was a contestant on Season 16 of Dancing With the Stars in 2013. He was partnered with former troupe member, Sharna Burgess, and placed seventh in the competition. Dick was on ABC's Celebrity Wife Swap on July 14, 2013.

Films 
One of his earliest film roles was a fictional version of himself in the film adaptation of video game Double Dragon. In 1993, Dick played himself in the mockumentary The Making of... And God Spoke. He also starred alongside MTV comedian Pauly Shore in the 1994 war comedy film In the Army Now.

In 1997, Dick had a supporting role alongside Luke Wilson and Jack Black in Bongwater, as Luke Wilson's gay friend who gives him a place to stay after his house burns to the ground. In 1999, Dick played one of Dr. Claw's henchmen in the movie Inspector Gadget.

In 2000, he made a cameo role in the motion picture Dude, Where's My Car?. That same year, he also appeared in the teenage comedy film Road Trip, playing a motel clerk. In 2001, Dick made a cameo in Ben Stiller's comedy Zoolander as Olga the Masseuse (Dick also made a cameo in Stiller's directorial debut, Reality Bites, in 1994).

In 2002, he was featured in the band Ash's music video "Envy" as a taxi cab driver. In 2003, he appeared in Will Ferrell's Old School as a gay sex education teacher, and as a villainous Santa in the movie The Hebrew Hammer. In 2005, Dick was featured in the documentary The Aristocrats. In 2006, he appeared in the film Employee of the Month as Lon, a nearsighted optician. He also provided the voice of Mombo in 2007's Happily N'Ever After and the voice of Boingo in Hoodwinked!.

His feature film directing debut was the 2006 film Danny Roane: First Time Director. In late December 2008, Dick announced on his official website that he had finished writing a script for a film starring his alter-ego Daphne Aguilera titled, Daphne Aguilera: Get into It.

Voiceover work 
In 1998, he lent his voice to the villain Nuka in the Disney direct-to-video animated film The Lion King II: Simba's Pride and provided the voice of Boingo for the Hoodwinked! movies. In November 2016, Dick reprised his role as Nuka for The Lion Guard TV series.

In 1999, he featured as the voice of Dilbert's assistant in the Dilbert animated series. He also was the voice of recurring character "Monkey Man" on the Nickelodeon TV series Hey Arnold!.

In 2002, Dick provided the voice of Mr. Sheepman and various other characters in the short-lived animated series Clone High.

Dick provides the voice of Maurice from the radio station WCTR's segment "Gardening with Maurice" in the video game Grand Theft Auto: San Andreas and he provided the voice of Aunt Beth in the 2006 video game Marc Eckō's Getting Up: Contents Under Pressure. He also was the voice of Dylan in 'The Reef'.

As of October 2006, Dick has hosted his own radio program, The Shit Show, on Howard Stern's Sirius channel Howard 101 every Thursday night at midnight eastern.

On August 19, 2009, Dick became a downloadable character in the PlayStation Network's video game Pain. In 2010, Dick voiced Jesus Christ in an episode of Mary Shelley's Frankenhole on Cartoon Network's Adult Swim.

Web series 
While under house arrest in 2009, Dick created and starred in the five-episode web series House Arrest with Andy Dick. The series features Dick's interviews with celebrity guests including Greg Grunberg, Drew Pinsky, Mo Collins, Joey Greco, and Jennifer Coolidge.

In 2012, Dick hosted Andy Dick Live! Dick and Pauly Shore discussed the possibility of a sequel to In the Army Now during his appearance on the show.

On September 19, 2013, Dick appeared in the first episode of the web series All Growz Up with Melinda Hill to talk about his early career and give advice to aspiring performers.

Personal life

Family 
Dick was married to Ivone Kowalczyk from 1986 to 1990, with whom he has a son born in 1988. He also has a son and a daughter with Lena Sved.

In a 2006 interview with The Washington Post, he said he is bisexual.

Drug and alcohol use disorders 
Dick states that he has struggled with drug and alcohol use disorders over the years and has entered into rehab programs 20 times in an effort to become sober.

Legal issues and controversies

Arrests and legal actions 
In 1999, Dick was questioned in the suicide of actor David Strickland and identified his body. On Saturday, March 20, the pair flew from Los Angeles to Las Vegas and spent three days partying in strip clubs. Strickland hanged himself with a bed sheet over the ceiling beam, and died during the morning hours of March 22, 1999. He was 29 years old.

On May 15, 1999, Dick drove his car into a utility pole in Hollywood. He was charged with the possession of cocaine, cannabis, and drug paraphernalia, driving under the influence of alcohol/drugs, and hit-and-run driving. He later pled guilty to felony cocaine possession, and misdemeanor cannabis possession and possession of a "smoking device". After Dick completed an 18-month drug diversion program the charges were dismissed.

On December 4, 2004, Dick was arrested for indecent exposure after he exposed his buttocks at a local McDonald's.

On July 16, 2008, Dick was arrested in Murrieta, California, on suspicion of drug possession and sexual battery. He exposed the breasts of a 17-year-old girl when he allegedly grabbed and pulled down her tank top and brassiere. During a search of his person, police reported finding a small quantity of cannabis and one alprazolam (Xanax) tablet for which Dick did not have a prescription. He was released from jail after posting $5,000 bail. Dick eventually plead guilty to misdemeanor battery and marijuana possession. He was sentenced to three years probation, around $700 in fines, and was ordered to wear an alcohol-monitoring bracelet for one year.

On January 23, 2010, Dick was arrested about 4 a.m. at a bar in Huntington, West Virginia, on charges of sexual abuse after reportedly groping a bartender and a patron. He was released from jail after pleading not guilty and posting $60,000 bail. On June 29, 2011, Dick was formally indicted by a Cabell County Grand Jury for two counts of first degree sexual abuse. Dick plead not guilty during a formal arraignment in Cabell County Circuit Court in Huntington on July 29, 2011. After receiving the not guilty plea, Judge Paul Ferrell set a trial date of January 17, 2012. After several delays, on May 21, 2012, Dick was given a six-month pre-trial diversion. An assistant prosecutor said that the agreement stated that if Dick would stay out of legal trouble for six months, the criminal charges would be dismissed. Criminal charges were dismissed after Dick completed the pretrial diversion program. In January 2012, the two alleged victims filed a civil suit against Dick for unspecified damages.

In March 2018, Lena Sved obtained a restraining order against Dick requiring him to stay at least 100 yards from Sved and the couple's children, Jacob and Meg, the order remaining in effect until March 13, 2023.

In June 2018, he was charged with misdemeanor sexual battery and battery charges for allegedly groping a woman in April that year. Dick plead not guilty in October 2019 to charges he grabbed an Uber driver by the genitals. In November 2022, he was sentenced to 90 days in jail as well as 12 months on summary probation. He was additionally ordered to attend 52 sexual compulsion anonymous sessions, 52 Alcoholics Anonymous sessions, 12 mental health counseling sessions, register as a sex offender, and pay restitution to the victim.

On June 29, 2021, Dick was arrested for felony assault with a deadly weapon. His fiancée, Elisa Jordana, spoke about the events leading up to it on her YouTube show, Kermit and Friends, saying that Dick assaulted his lover Lucas with a metal chair. "He could have killed him," she said. She also stated "It was just the worst week with him. It was getting worse and worse and worse, and just every day there was some kind of problem. And there were signs that this was gonna happen." Dick was released from jail on June 30, 2021, after posting the $50,000 bond.

On May 10, 2022, Dick was arrested for felony sexual battery of a man in Orange County, California. However, the case was later dropped when the accuser refused to cooperate with the local police.

In October 2022, Dick was arrested for felony burglary, allegedly of power tools.

On January 13, 2023, Dick was arrested for public intoxication and failure to register as a sex offender in Lake Elsinore, California.

Other behavior 
In 2005, Dick dropped his pants and exposed his genitals to the audience at Yuk Yuk's comedy club in Edmonton, Alberta. He was ushered off the stage, and the second night was cancelled.

Dick groped Pamela Anderson during her 2005 Comedy Central roast. He joked that he was her plastic surgeon and used the premise to repeatedly grab her breasts. During the roast, Dick also attempted to grope Courtney Love, who proceeded to slap him across the face. Dick also mimed performing oral sex on Anderson's husband at the time, Tommy Lee.

In December 2006, Dick upset an audience at The Improv in Los Angeles by shouting "You're all a bunch of niggers!" following an improvised set with comedian Ian Bagg. This was a direct reference to Michael Richards' use of the same epithet to insult hecklers two weeks earlier. He later issued an apology via his publicist:

In February 2007, Dick was forcibly removed from the stage during an appearance on Jimmy Kimmel Live!, after repeatedly touching guest Ivanka Trump. Jimmy Kimmel called in his security guards, Uncle Frank and Veatrice Rice, who assisted as Kimmel dragged Dick off by his legs. Kimmel later said "Andy did a segment, he was a little out of it. [When Ivanka] came out, he wanted a big, wet kiss. It was time for Andy to go, so I escorted him out by his feet." Kimmel added, "He always makes me a little uncomfortable, you have no idea what he's going to do next." Kimmel also said he had spoken to Dick afterwards and that Dick was not upset about the incident.

In October 2010, Dick was seen exposing himself and making a commotion at Café Audrey in Hollywood.

In January 2011, Dick was thrown out of the AVN Awards, a pornographic movie awards ceremony, after repeatedly groping and stalking adult film actress Tera Patrick and drag queen Chi Chi LaRue.

In April 2011, Dick was at a party connected with the Newport Beach Film Festival. He appeared intoxicated, exposed himself, urinated on a backdrop and afterwards destroyed it by pulling it down. The organizers claimed that this caused thousands of dollars of damage and considered suing Dick over the incident.

In August 2011, Dick was a guest on Greg Fitzsimmons' radio show and made antisemitic statements about Howard Stern. Dick said Stern was a "money-grubbing Jew" and repeatedly called him a "hook-nosed Jew".

In October 2017, Dick was fired from a role in the independent film Raising Buchanan due to allegations of inappropriate behavior that, according to The Hollywood Reporter, "included groping people's genitals, unwanted kissing/licking and sexual propositions of at least four members of the production". While he denied most of the allegations, he said "I might have kissed somebody on the cheek to say goodbye and then licked them. That's my thing – I licked Carrie Fisher at a roast. It's me being funny." It would later be revealed that in the same month he had also been fired and escorted off the set from another film, Vampire Dad, due to what was referred to as "multiple, flagrant acts of improper conduct and inappropriate contact with several crew members". He later said "I overtook my medication and took too many Xanax and I was a bit loopy". He said "I won't do it anymore. I won't lick anyone's face anymore. We have an agreement."

In 2019, a man knocked Dick out with a punch to the head, which caused Dick to be sent to the hospital to be monitored for brain bleed. The man accused Dick of groping him, and punched Dick in retaliation.

In April 2022, Dick alleged he was mugged in Las Vegas, presenting severe facial injuries.

Feud with Jon Lovitz 
Dick has had a long rivalry with former NewsRadio costar Jon Lovitz concerning the death of their mutual friend Phil Hartman. According to Lovitz, Dick had given Hartman's wife Brynn cocaine at a Christmas party at Hartman's house in 1997; Brynn, a recovering addict, began using drugs again, culminating in her killing Hartman and herself on May 28, 1998. When Lovitz joined the cast of NewsRadio as Hartman's replacement, he and Dick got into a heated argument in which Lovitz reportedly shouted "I wouldn't be here if you hadn't given Brynn coke in the first place." Lovitz later apologized to Dick for the remark.

In early 2007, Dick approached Lovitz at a restaurant and said "I put the Phil Hartman hex on you—you're the next to die." On July 10, 2007, Dick got into a physical altercation with Lovitz at the Laugh Factory in Los Angeles. Lovitz demanded an apology from Dick, who refused and accused Lovitz of blaming him for Hartman's death. Lovitz then grabbed Dick by his shirt and slammed him backwards into the bar, after which the doorman separated the two.

Discography

Albums 
 Andy Dick & The Bitches of the Century (2002)
 Do Your Shows Always Suck? (2007)
 The Darkest Day of the Year (2009)

Singles 
 Happy B-Day JC (w/ Willie Wisely) (2006)
 Addiction: Andy Dick Counsels the Dark Bob (w/ The Dark Bob) (2012)

Collaborations 
 The Dark Bob: Stoked! (2006) – song: Father

Compilation appearances 
 The Aristocrats (Original Soundtrack) (2005)
 Hoodwinked! (Original Motion Picture Soundtrack) (2005)
 Live Nude Comedy Vol. 2 (2010)
 The Adam Carolla Show 2009, Vol. 1 (2014)
 The Adam Carolla Show 2009, Vol. 2 (2014)
 The Adam Carolla Show 2009, Vol. 3 (2014)
 The Adam Carolla Show 2010, Vol.1 (2014)
 The Un & Only (2015)
 The Good, The Bad, And the Drugly (2015)

Filmography

Film

Television

Video games

Music video appearances

References

External links 
 
 Q&A With Andy Dick – AllYourTV.com
 
 

1965 births
Male actors from South Carolina
American adoptees
American sketch comedians
American male film actors
American male television actors
American male voice actors
Bisexual male actors
Bisexual comedians
Bisexual musicians
Living people
American people convicted of drug offenses
Male actors from Charleston, South Carolina
Participants in American reality television series
LGBT people from South Carolina
American LGBT musicians
Comedians from South Carolina
21st-century American comedians
20th-century American LGBT people
21st-century American LGBT people
American bisexual actors
American LGBT comedians